ISO screw thread may refer to:
ISO metric screw thread
ISO inch screw thread